Houghton Township may refer to the following places:

Canada
 Houghton Township, Ontario

United States
 Houghton Township, Michigan

Township name disambiguation pages